Nathaniel Otis Mendez-Laing (born 15 April 1992) is an English professional footballer who plays as a winger for Derby County.

Born in Birmingham, he began his career with Wolverhampton Wanderers, making his professional debut in 2009 at the age of nineteen. However, after loan spells with Peterborough United and Sheffield United, he left the club, joining Peterborough on a permanent deal in 2012.

He made 60 appearances for Peterborough, spending time on loan with Portsmouth, Shrewsbury Town and Cambridge United, before joining Rochdale where he made 83 appearances during a two-year spell. In 2017, he joined Cardiff City, where he helped the side win promotion to the Premier League in his first season.

Mendez-Laing has also represented England at under-16 and under-17 level.

Career

Wolverhampton Wanderers
Born in Birmingham, West Midlands to a Jamaican father and a Belizean mother of Guatemalan descent, Mendez-Laing is a product of the Wolverhampton Wanderers academy. Having represented England at under-16 and under-17 level, he made his senior debut for Wolves on 25 August 2009 in a League Cup victory over Swindon Town and was named Man of the Match for his performance at the age of seventeen. He subsequently signed his first professional contract with the club in March 2010.

Mendez-Laing joined League One side Peterborough United on loan for the 2010–11 season on 1 July 2010. He made his debut for the club on the opening day of the 2010–11 season, starting in a 3–0 victory over Bristol Rovers. He made forty appearances in total, scoring five times, during the season as Peterborough made the play-offs, where they won promotion back to the Championship at the first attempt. During the close season, between June and August, it was confirmed that a fee had been agreed to permanently transfer Mendez-Laing to Peterborough, around £250,000. However, the move collapsed when personal terms could not be agreed.

Instead of moving back to Peterborough, Mendez-Laing moved on loan to League One side Sheffield United in a deal to run until 3 January 2012, making his début for the Blades a few days later, in the first found of the League Cup against Hartlepool United. He played regularly until picking up an injury at the end of September which sidelined him for a number of weeks. Having returned to his parent club for rehabilitation he then sustained another injury whilst warming up for his first game back at Bramall Lane which was to keep him out for the remainder of his loan spell, thus he returned to the Midlands having made eleven appearances and scoring one goal in his time at United.

Peterborough United
In July 2012, Mendez-Laing revived his move to former loan club Peterborough United, a deal that he had turned down the previous summer. He signed a three-year contract after the clubs agreed an undisclosed fee. He later commented on his departure from Wolves, stating that he chose to accept Peterborough's second offer as he "wanted to go and play" but believed he was given the wrong guidance. His Peterborough debut was delayed after he sustained a hamstring injury, which was expected to rule him out for between four and six weeks. He returned from injury on 15 September 2012 and scored his first goal for Peterborough on his debut in a 5–2 away defeat to Burnley. In November of that year Mendez-Laing was suspended and placed on the transfer list after a public-order offence in Peterborough town centre with teammates Gabriel Zakuani, Emile Sinclair and Tyrone Barnett,
with manager Darren Ferguson announcing that Mendez-Laing subsequently had no future at the club.

On 15 November 2012, Mendez-Laing signed on a one-month loan for Portsmouth, making his debut, on 17 November 2012, in a 1–0 loss against Doncaster Rovers. After the match, Mendez-Laing spoke about his debut, saying Portsmouth could reap the benefits of reviving his career. After making four appearances, Mendez-Laing's loan spell at Portsmouth was extended until the start of January. After five further appearances however, Mendez-Laing returned to Peterborough.

Following his return from Portsmouth, Mendez-Laing made an appearance for Peterborough as a substitute in a 2–1 loss against Nottingham Forest. Soon after, manager Darren Ferguson explained his apparent change of heart regarding Mendez-Laing, saying that he (Ferguson) had now forgiven him, commenting "I don't bear grudges. Mendez-Laing is back at the club and it's now up to me and the coaching staff to get the best out of him as a player. He clearly has ability, but he must also now knuckle down and do all he can to help this team." His return saw him gain more playing time in the first team and he scored his second Peterborough goal, in a 5–1 win over Millwall on 19 February 2013. He scored his third goal in the last game of the season, a 3–2 loss against Crystal Palace, that confirmed Peterborough's relegation.

Ahead of the 2013–14 season, Mendez-Laing switched shirt number from 44 to 19. However, at the start of the season, he was left out for the first four matches at the start of the season and drew criticism from Ferguson over his fitness levels: "Mendez didn't come back to the club anywhere near fit enough." His first appearance of the 2013–14 season came on 24 August 2013 where he came on as a substitute for Lee Tomlin in the 74th minute during a 5–0 victory over Tranmere Rovers. His fitness concerns continued, resulting him being an unused substitute for four matches, although he scored a hat-trick for the club's reserve side in a 4–0 win over Thresham College. After this, Mendez-Laing returned to the first team and scored his first league goal of the season, in a 1–0 win over Shrewsbury Town on 19 October 2013.

On 30 January 2014, Mendez-Laing was sent out on loan to Shrewsbury Town on a short-term deal. He made his Shrewsbury debut two days later, coming on as a substitute for Bahrudin Atajić in the 59th minute of a 1–1 draw against Brentford. His loan spell at Shrewsbury was extended for another month despite suffering a slight hamstring injury that kept him out for a week. However, he suffered another injury, resulting his loan spell with Shrewsbury coming to an end by the end of March. After his return to Peterborough, Mendez-Laing returned to the first team and featured for the last three remaining games of the season, including a match against Shrewsbury Town, the team he played during the season, where he provided an assist for Josh McQuoid, who scored in a 4–2 win, resulting in Shrewsbury's relegation on 26 April 2014.

In the 2014–15 season, Mendez-Laing received praise from his manager Ferguson who stated "I've got a responsibility to manage him and get the best out of him. We feel we're there with that." His turnaround resulted in him featuring in the first team at the start of the season, providing an assist for Kenny McEvoy in a 3–2 win over Milton Keynes Dons on 16 August 2014. However, he suffered a thigh injury that kept him out until October. He made his first team return on 21 October 2014, coming on as a substitute for Ricardo Santos in the 74th minute, in a 1–0 loss against Crewe Alexandra. By the end of January, Mendez-Laing was told by the club that he could leave the club to find first team regular after he turned down two loan moves.

On 18 February 2015, Mendez-Laing was loaned to League Two side Cambridge United for the remainder of the 2014–15 season. He made an impact on his Cambridge debut when he scored his first goal for the club, though Cambridge United lost 6–2 to Portsmouth. He went on to make twenty-two appearances for the club before returning to his parent club at the end of the season. At the end of the 2014–15 season, he was released by Peterborough after spending three years there.

Rochdale
On 27 August 2015, Mendez-Laing joined League One side Rochdale on a one-year deal, making his debut as a substitute in place of Matty Lund during a 1–0 defeat to Burton Albion on 12 September 2015. Following his arrival, Rochdale manager Keith Hill stated his belief that he could "revive" Mendez-Laing's career, commenting "I personally don't think he has ever been fit enough to maintain and showcase his ability for 90 minutes." However, he did not make his first league start until October 2015, when mounting injuries saw him named in the starting line-up for a 3–2 defeat to Sheffield United. A month later, Mendez-Laing scored his first goals for the club with a hat-trick in a 3–1 victory over Swindon Town in the second round of the FA Cup. He scored his first league goal three weeks later during a 2–1 victory over Port Vale. He helped Rochdale to a mid-table finish, ending the season with a goal in their last match, a 2–1 victory over relegated Colchester United. Having scored 10 goals in 36 appearances, at the end of the season, Rochdale activated their one-year extension option on his contract to extend his stay at the club.

In his second season with Rochdale, Mendez-Laing started the campaign as an established player in the first team and scored his first goal of the season in a 3–1 victory over Chesterfield in the EFL Cup. He scored his first league goals of the season in October 2016, netting in back-to-back victories over Southend United and Bury. He reached double figures for both goals and assists, including scoring six goals in the final two months of the season, as Rochdale narrowly missed out on a spot in the play-offs by four points. With his contract due to expire, leaving him available on a free transfer, he became a transfer target for several Championship and League One sides following his performances for Rochdale.

Cardiff City
On 30 May 2017, Mendez-Laing agreed to join Championship side Cardiff City on a free transfer after turning down a new contract at Rochdale. He had been set to join a rival Championship club, with a deal due to be concluded later the same day, but was convinced to move by Cardiff manager Neil Warnock. He made his debut for the club on the opening day of the 2017–18 season during a 1–0 victory over Burton Albion, as a substitute in place of Bruno Ecuele Manga. He scored his first goal for the Bluebirds on 8 August, scoring in a 2–1 win over Portsmouth in the EFL Cup. Mendez-Laing was named August Player of the Month, following a further four goals, helping Cardiff to win their opening five league matches for the first time in their history. However, after a dip in form later in the season coupled with a month out through injury after being substituted within the first ten minutes of a Severnside derby, Cardiff manager Neil Warnock revealed that Mendez-Laing had been wrongly prescribed medication for his asthma that had affected his performances. In his first season with Cardiff, he made 42 appearances in all competitions, helping the side win promotion to the Premier League after finishing the season as runners-up.

Mendez-Laing was awarded a contract extension until 2021 during the summer. He made his first career appearance in the Premier League on the opening day of the 2018–19 season, starting in a 2–0 defeat to Bournemouth. Two games later, he suffered a knee injury following a collision with Huddersfield Town goalkeeper, Ben Hamer, which ruled him out for up to three months. He made his return in a 3–1 loss at West Ham United on 4 December, before starting the following game against Southampton. He scored his first Premier League goal on 29 January 2019, in a 2–1 loss against Arsenal. He scored twice in a 0-2 away win against Manchester United on 12 May 2019.

On 9 September 2020, Mendez-Laing's contract with Cardiff City was terminated, following an alleged breach of contract. It was later revealed that this was due to a positive drugs test, having been banned for three months for cocaine usage.

Middlesbrough
On 1 February 2021, Mendez-Laing joined fellow Championship side Middlesbrough, reuniting with Neil Warnock, his former manager at Cardiff City. Twelve days later, he made his debut for Boro as a substitute for Duncan Watmore in a 2–1 league defeat against Derby County. He scored his first goal for Middlesbrough in a 3–0 win over Stoke City on 13 March 2021.

On 28 May 2021, it was announced that he would leave Middlesbrough at the end of the season, following the expiry of his contract.

Sheffield Wednesday
On 22 November 2021, Mendez-Laing joined League One club Sheffield Wednesday, after spending time with the club on trial. He would make his first appearance for the club, coming off the bench against Wycombe Wanderers on 27 November 2021. His first goal for the club would come against Plymouth Argyle in EFL League One on 15 January 2022. A few days after his first goal for the club, it was reported that his contract would run out after their upcoming game against Oxford United. Following the end of the season, Mendez-Laing was offered a new contract by the Owls. On 22 June 2022, it was confirmed that he had rejected his new contract and would leave the club.

Derby County
On 2 July 2022, he joined Derby County on a two-year deal. He scored his first goal for Derby in a win against Barnsley on 13 August 2022.

Career statistics

Honours
Cardiff City
EFL Championship runner-up: 2017–18

Individual
EFL Championship Player of the Month: August 2017

References

External links

1992 births
Living people
Footballers from Birmingham, West Midlands
English footballers
England youth international footballers
Association football wingers
Wolverhampton Wanderers F.C. players
Peterborough United F.C. players
Sheffield United F.C. players
Portsmouth F.C. players
Shrewsbury Town F.C. players
Cambridge United F.C. players
Rochdale A.F.C. players
Cardiff City F.C. players
Middlesbrough F.C. players
Sheffield Wednesday F.C. players
Derby County F.C. players
English Football League players
Premier League players
Black British sportspeople
Doping cases in association football
English sportspeople in doping cases
English sportspeople of Jamaican descent
English people of Belizean descent
English people of Guatemalan descent
Sportspeople of Guatemalan descent